Gazi Warriors is the American football team of Gazi University in Ankara, Turkey. It was founded in 1998 by a few students, and competes in the American Football First League of Turkey and American Football University League of Turkey.

Achievements
Gazi Warriors became champion in the first season 2007-08 of the University League winning over another Ankara team Hacettepe Red Deers with 36–18 in the final game at Beypete Campus in Ankara. In the 2010-11 First League season, Gazi Warriors won their first ever championship title after defeating the defending champion Istanbul team Boğaziçi Sultans in the final match with six additional periods at the Sakarya Atatürk Stadium in Adapazarı that lasted a record time of around five hours. The following season, Gazi Warriors became for the second consecutive time champion defeating Hacettepe Red Deers 46-12 in the final match at the Cebeci İnönü Stadium in Ankara.

References

American football teams in Turkey
Sports teams in Ankara
Gazi University
American football teams established in 1998
1998 establishments in Turkey
Student sport in Turkey
Türkiye Korumalı Futbol Ligi teams
American football teams in Ankara